Downtown is the third album by singer/songwriter Marshall Crenshaw. Recorded after the relative failure of his album Field Day, Downtown was a departure from his previous albums due to its more rootsy sound.

The album received moderately positive reviews, though less positive than his previous work, and was commercially unsuccessful, peaking at number 113.

Background
After the relative disappointment of Field Day, Crenshaw had unsuccessfully attempted to leave Warner Bros. Records. Because of the conditions under which the album was recorded, Crenshaw felt that the songs on the album had a "downcast vibe" to them. He recalled, "That was in a period where I was really having trouble finishing things, and even committing to finishing things. My brain was really pretty scrambled at that point in time. That was after Field Day, and the whole fallout with that, where there was a real sense of doom about my career. It was really weird. If somebody had been able to whisper in my ear back then and tell me that everything was going to be reasonably okay… I wish somebody would've been able to do that. I was really worried."

Crenshaw decided to embark on a stylistic change from his previous albums, aiming for a more rootsy sound. This is seen in his choice of producer, T-Bone Burnett; Crenshaw explained, "That [change in style] was genuine because I was really obsessed with that kind of music. [Producer] T Bone Burnett is a brilliant guy. He was very focused, very serious. He was one of those people I crossed paths with back then who was super driven, super ambitious, someone who wasn't going to be denied or thwarted."

Release and reception

Downtown was released in 1985 and featured three singles, "Little Wild One (No. 5)", "Blues Is King", and "The Distance Between". "Blues Is King" was inspired by the B.B. King album Blues Is King; Crenshaw was mixed on the song, saying, "I was never 100 percent happy with the lyrics, but I always thought the music was really beautiful, and that the track was nice, too. I don't play that one much. I haven't played it probably since the record was out."

Downtown was commercially less successful than its predecessors, hitting number 113 while its singles failed to chart. The album has received positive reception, with Robert Christgau calling it "well-crafted" and "fully imagined," though both Christgau and AllMusic rated Crenshaw's previous work higher.

Track listing
All songs written by Marshall Crenshaw, except where noted.
"Little Wild One (No. 5)" – 3:55
"Yvonne" – 3:53
"Blues Is King" – 3:49
"Terrifying Love" – 4:05
"Like a Vague Memory" – 4:07
"The Distance Between" – 3:42
"(We're Gonna) Shake Up Their Minds" – 3:34
"I'm Sorry (But So Is Brenda Lee)" (Ben Vaughn) – 3:21
"Right Now" (Sylvester Bradford, Al Lewis) – 2:38
"Lesson Number One" – 4:08

"Blues is King" was produced by Mitch Easter and Marshall Crenshaw.

Personnel
Marshall Crenshaw - guitars, vocals, bass, percussion
Mickey Curry – drums
Mitchell Froom – keyboards
David Miner – bass, cannon plug
Tony Levin – bass
Jerry Marotta – drums, percussion, bongos
T-Bone Burnett – electric sitar, Linn program, vocals
Robert Crenshaw – drums
G. E. Smith – guitar
Mitch Easter – piano
Tom Ardolino – drums
Joey Spampinato – bass
Tony Garnier – bass
Faye Hunter – bass
Steve Fischel – steel guitar
Warren Klein – tamboura
 Genny Schorr Wardrobe Stylist

References 

1985 albums
Marshall Crenshaw albums
Albums produced by T Bone Burnett
Warner Records albums